Miland "Mille" Petrozza (born 18 December 1967) is a German musician of Italian descent. He is best known as the lead vocalist and rhythm guitarist of thrash metal band Kreator, which he started playing in as Tyrant in 1982 and renamed into Tormentor in 1984. He is also the principal songwriter of the band and the only member to appear on every Kreator album.

Petrozza also shared lead vocals in union with Tomas Lindberg for the track "Dirty Coloured Knife" on the self-titled 2002 album from Israeli metal act Nail Within.

In 1994, he played guitar in the metal all-star band Voodoocult, amongst such artists as Dave Lombardo of Slayer and Chuck Schuldiner of Death.

He appeared on Edguy's 2004 album, Hellfire Club, providing lead vocals on an alternate version of the album's opening song, "Mysteria", featured as a bonus track to the album. He also appeared on Caliban's 2006 album, The Undying Darkness, on "Moment of Clarity".

He also appeared on the 2010 Volbeat album Beyond Hell/Above Heaven on the track titled "7 Shots". Petrozza and drummer Stefan Schwarzmann played for the recording of the 2012 album Revolution by Lacrimosa.

Petrozza is vegan. He and his wife regularly contributed to the vegan magazine Kochen ohne Knochen, run by Joachim Hiller. Petrozza has also collaborated with Peta2, but he believes his lifestyle is a personal choice, "I do not want to preach my lifestyle on others".

Discography
 Kreator
 Endless Pain (1985)
 Pleasure to Kill (1986)
 Terrible Certainty (1987)
 Extreme Aggression (1989)
 Coma of Souls (1990)
 Renewal (1992)
 Cause for Conflict (1995)
 Outcast (1997)
 Endorama (1999)
 Violent Revolution (2001)
 Enemy of God (2005)
 Hordes of Chaos (2009)
 Phantom Antichrist (2012)
 Gods of Violence (2017)
 Hate Über Alles (2022)

 Voodoocult
 Jesus Killing Machine (1994)

 Edguy
 Hellfire Club (2004)

 Lacrimosa
 Revolution (2012)

Avantasia
 Moonglow (2019)

References

External links

 Biography on Kreator's official website

1967 births
Kreator members
Living people
German male guitarists
German baritones
German heavy metal guitarists
German heavy metal musicians
German heavy metal singers
German male singers
German people of Calabrian descent
German people of Italian descent
German guitarists
Musicians from Essen
Rhythm guitarists
Thrash metal musicians
Voodoocult members